Henry Swire (28 April 1901 – 9 July 1964) was a British sports shooter. He competed at the 1948 Summer Olympics and 1952 Summer Olympics.

References

1901 births
1964 deaths
British male sport shooters
Olympic shooters of Great Britain
Shooters at the 1948 Summer Olympics
Shooters at the 1952 Summer Olympics
People from Whitechapel
Sportspeople from London